Graham Road Oval is an Australian rules football venue located in Carseldine, a suburb of Brisbane, Queensland. It is the home ground of the Aspley Australian rules football club in the Victorian Football League and other local football competitions. The ground is the most prominent aspect of the club's multi-purpose sports, dining and recreation facility.

References

North East Australian Football League grounds
Victorian Football League grounds
Multi-purpose stadiums in Australia
Sports venues in Brisbane